The 2003–04 Ivy League men's basketball season was the Ivy League's 50th season of basketball. The team with the best record (Princeton Tigers) played in the 2004 NCAA Men's Division I Basketball Tournament. Jason Forte, a junior point guard from the Brown Bears, was awarded the Ivy League Men's Basketball Player of the Year.

Standings

References